Palo Alto Junior Museum and Zoo is located in Palo Alto, California and part of the City of Palo Alto's Community Services Department (CSD). It was founded in 1934 by Josephine O’Hara in the basement of a local elementary school. The small zoo holds approximately 200 species of mostly indigenous wildlife such as bobcats, raccoons, hedgehogs, ducks, bats, snakes and more. The museum has an interactive scientific exhibition that is changed every few years. They offer science classes to local students, over 14,000 students a year.

In December 2017, Palo Alto's City Council unanimously approved plans for a $25 million reconstruction project. The museum re-opened to the public in 2021.

References

External links

Friends of the Palo Alto Junior Museum & Zoo

Buildings and structures in Palo Alto, California
Tourist attractions in Santa Clara County, California
Zoos established in 1934
Zoos in California
1934 establishments in California